Fatalism and Development: Nepal's Struggle for Modernization is the most notable book about the local socio-cultural issues of Nepalese people. It is written by the renowned and most controversial anthropologist of Nepal, Dor Bahadur Bista.

See also 
 The Nepal Nexus
 All Roads Lead North

References

History books about Nepal

Nepalese books
Nepalese non-fiction books
1991 books
20th-century Nepalese books
English books by Nepalese writer
Nepalese literature in English